Oncideres dejeanii is a species of beetle in the family Cerambycidae. It was described by James Thomson in 1868. It is known from Argentina, Paraguay, Brazil and Uruguay.

References

dejeanii
Beetles described in 1868